The Association for Science Education (ASE) is a professional association in the United Kingdom for teachers of science and science technicians.  The association was formed in 1963 and is a member of the UK Science Council.

Aims 
The Royal Charter of the Association for Science Education States,

"The objects and purposes for which The Association is hereby constituted are the promotion of education by the following means:

 by improving the teaching of science and
 by providing an authoritative medium through which opinions of teachers of science may be expressed on educational matters and
 by affording means of communication among all persons and bodies of persons concerned with the teaching of science in particular and with education in general."

History
The ASE formed in 1963 by the merger of the Science Masters Association and the Association of Women Science Teachers. The Association for Science Education can trace its origins back to 1900. The first Annual Meeting was held in January 1901 which then led to the formation of the Association of Public School Science Masters. Incorporated by Royal Charter in October 2004, the ASE operates as a Registered Charity. The history of the ASE can be found in two publications: Interpreters of Science by David Layton and, published to celebrate the 50th anniversary of the association,  Advancing Science Education: the first fifty years of the Association for Science Education, Edited by Edgar Jenkins and Valerie Wood-Robinson.

The Patron of the Association is Prince Philip, Duke of Edinburgh, KG, PC, KT, GBE, FRS.

Activities
The Association promotes improvements in science education and education in general, specifically through advice and support for teachers, technicians and others with meetings and conferences, journals and resources, curriculum and professional development programmes and contributions to research and policy debates.

Bookshop
The ASE is a specialist publisher for the science education market. This includes approximately 200 titles ranging from Primary to Secondary and Post 16 science education.

Journals
The ASE produces four journals which not only keep members up to date with developments in science education but also provide ideas and tips for the delivery of science education. Their journals include:
Education in Science - the in house journal keeping members up to date with ASE developments.
Primary Science (previously: Primary Science Review) - aimed at the primary sector, giving ideas for lessons and developments in primary science education.
School Science Review - aimed at the secondary sector, giving ideas for lessons and developments in primary science education.
Science Teacher Education - aimed at providers of initial teacher training and aims to inform and contribute to the development of science teacher education in all phases of education.

Annual Conference 
The annual conference attracts over 3000 delegates and include 350+ talks and workshops ranging from academic lectures and exhibitions, to a social programme and themed days.

Governance 
An elected Education Group governs and controls the affairs of the Association. The Education Group advises the Trustees on all aspects of science education. Its 30 members represent all sectors of the science education community and speaks authoritatively on behalf of the Association. The group is led by the Chair of the Association and meets 3 times a year.  The Chair of the Association is elected by the membership and serves a term of one year.

The Trustee Body has responsibility for ensuring that ASE works properly as a charity, that the finances are properly regulated and monitored and the appropriate policies are in place. The trustees meets 3 times a year and consists of 11 member trustees.

List of presidents and association chairs from 1963–2020

Awards 
The ASE is involved with many awards including:
 Chartered Science Teacher (CSciTeach)
 Registered Scientist
 Registered Science Technician

See also

Glossary of areas of mathematics
Glossary of astronomy
Glossary of biology
Glossary of chemistry
Glossary of engineering
Glossary of physics

References

External links
Official website
Science Learning Centres website
 * The Center for Mathematics, Science, and Technology

Teacher associations based in the United Kingdom
Science education in the United Kingdom
1963 establishments in the United Kingdom
Organizations established in 1963
Hatfield, Hertfordshire
Organisations based in Hertfordshire
Science and technology in Hertfordshire